Konstantinos Galanidis (born 1 September 1990) is a male water polo goalkeeper from Greece. He was part of the Greece men's national water polo team at the 2013 World Aquatics Championships in Barcelona, Spain, where they finished in 6th place. At club level, he played for Olympiacos.

See also
 Greece at the 2013 World Aquatics Championships

References

External links
 

1990 births
Living people
Place of birth missing (living people)
Water polo players from Chania
Greek male water polo players
Water polo goalkeepers
Olympiacos Water Polo Club players
Mediterranean Games medalists in water polo
Mediterranean Games bronze medalists for Greece
Competitors at the 2013 Mediterranean Games
Water polo players at the 2020 Summer Olympics
Medalists at the 2020 Summer Olympics
Olympic silver medalists for Greece
Olympic medalists in water polo
Olympic water polo players of Greece